The East Indies (or simply the Indies) is a term used in historical narratives of the Age of Discovery. The Indies refers to various lands in the East or the Eastern hemisphere, particularly the islands and mainlands found in and around the Indian Ocean by Portuguese explorers, soon after the Cape route was discovered. Nowadays, this term is broadly used to refer to the Malay Archipelago, which today comprises the Philippine Archipelago, Indonesian Archipelago, Borneo, and New Guinea. Historically, the term was used in the Age of Discovery to refer to the coasts of the landmasses comprising the Indian subcontinent and the Indochinese Peninsula along with the Malay Archipelago.

Overview

During the era of European colonization, territories of the Spanish Empire in Asia were known as the Spanish East Indies for 333 years before the American conquest. Dutch occupied colonies in the area were known for about 300 years as the Dutch East Indies till Indonesian independence. The East Indies may also include the former French Indochina, former British territories Brunei, Hong Kong and Singapore and former Portuguese Macau and Timor. It does not, however, include the former Netherlands New Guinea, which is geographically considered to be part of Melanesia.

The inhabitants of the East Indies are never called East Indians, as they are not linguistically related to South Asia, most specifically the Indo-Aryan languages. It distinguishes them both from inhabitants of the Caribbean (which is also called the West Indies) and from the indigenous peoples of the Americas who are often called American Indians. In colonial times, they were just "natives".

Peoples of the East Indies comprise a wide variety of cultural diversity, and the inhabitants do not consider themselves as belonging to a single ethnic group. The region is mostly populated by the Austronesians, who first expanded from the island of Taiwan, and later on during the early modern period, when East Asians such as the Han Chinese started to migrate south and became known as the Peranakans or Straits Chinese.

Buddhism, Christianity, Islam and Hinduism are the most popular religions throughout the region, while Sikhism, Jainism, Chinese folk religion and various other traditional beliefs and practices are also prominent in some areas. The major languages in this area draw from a wide variety of language families such as the Austronesian and Sino-Tibetan languages, and should not be confused with the term Indo-Aryan, a group of languages spoken in the Indian subcontinent.

Regions of the East Indies are sometimes known by the colonial empire they once belonged to, hence, Spanish East Indies means the Philippines, Dutch East Indies means Indonesia, and British East Indies refers to Malaysia.

Historically, the king of Abyssinia (modern Ethiopia) was identified with "Prester John of the Indies", since that part of the world was imagined to be one of "Three Indias".

History

Exploration of the East Indies by European powers began in the last three years of the 15th century and continued into the 16th century, led by the Portuguese explorers.  The Portuguese described the entire region they discovered as the Indies. Eventually, the region would be broken up into a series of Indies: The East Indies, which was also called "Old Indies" or "Great Indies", consisting of India, and the West Indies, also called "New Indies" or "Little Indies", consisting of the Americas.

These regions were important sources of trading goods, particularly cotton, indigo and spices after the establishment of European trading companies: the British East India Company and Dutch East India Company, among others, in the 17th century.

The New World was initially thought to be the easternmost part of the Indies by explorer Christopher Columbus, who had grossly underestimated the westerly distance from Europe to Asia. Later, to avoid confusion, the New World came to be called the "West Indies", while the original Indies came to be called the "East Indies".

The designation East Indian was once primarily used to describe people of all of the East Indies, in order to avoid the potential confusion from the term American Indian who were once simply referred to as Indians (see the Native American name controversy for more information).

According to Xuanzang "The circumference of the Five Indies is about 90,000 li; on three sides it is surrounded by a great sea; on the north it is supported by icy mountains. In the north it is wide and narrow in the south; its shape is crescent".

See also
West Indies

Spanish East Indies
Dutch East Indies
Insulindia
Portuguese East Indies
List of Governors-General of the Philippines
Greater Philippines
List of Governors-General of the Dutch East Indies
List of governors of the Straits Settlements
Malayness
Bumiputera
Pribumi
Malay world
Malay Archipelago
Malay race
Maphilindo
Maritime Southeast Asia
Nusantara
Greater Indonesia
History of the Americas

References

Archipelagoes of Southeast Asia
Archipelagoes of the Pacific Ocean
Maritime Southeast Asia
Regions of Asia
European colonisation in Asia
Geography of Southeast Asia
Historical regions